Jean Shiley Newhouse (November 20, 1911 – March 11, 1998) was an American high jumper. She was born Jean Shiley in Harrisburg, Pennsylvania, and later moved to Havertown, a Philadelphia suburb, where she joined the team at Haverford High School.

Shiley tied with Babe Didrikson in the trials for the 1932 Summer Olympics in Los Angeles.

Didrikson was also given a share in the world record and this, though equalled a few times, stood until 1939. Shiley was ruled ineligible for the 1936 Games as she had worked as a swimming instructor.

References
 USATF Hall of Fame
 Sports Reference

External links 
 
 
 
 

1911 births
1998 deaths
Sportspeople from Harrisburg, Pennsylvania
American female high jumpers
Athletes (track and field) at the 1928 Summer Olympics
Athletes (track and field) at the 1932 Summer Olympics
Medalists at the 1932 Summer Olympics
Olympic gold medalists for the United States in track and field
20th-century American women
20th-century American people